"Rapide" is a song performed by Italian singer Mahmood. The song was released as a digital download on 16 January 2020 by Island Records. The song peaked at number five on the Italian Singles Chart.

Background
The song was produced by Dardust and written by Mahmood, Dario Faini (as Dardust) and Francesco Catitti. Wiwibloggs said, "'Rapide' sets a different tone compared to Mahmood's previous singles 'Barrio' and 'Soldi'. The track sees the reigning Sanremo champ touches upon different relationship aspects. He gets even with a past love. Lyrics like "I won't fall into your rapids" or "now that I have nothing I'll defend myself from the trust I didn't and don't have" underline his state of mind. Mahmood also brings the subject of cheating and heartbreak across in his delicate vocal delivery. With the support of simple yet effective production, the chorus is where his voice stands out the most. Several Italian expletives are interwoven throughout the lyrics, illustrating his frustrations."

Music video
A music video to accompany the release of "Rapide" was first released onto YouTube on 23 January 2020. The music video was produced by Antonio Giampalo for Maestro Production.

Accolades

Track listing

Charts

Weekly charts

Year-end charts

Certifications

Release history

References

2020 songs
2020 singles
Mahmood (singer) songs
Songs written by Mahmood
Songs written by Dario Faini